Clepsis gnathocera is a species of moth of the family Tortricidae. It is found in Eswatini.

The wingspan is about 22 mm. The ground colour of the forewings is cream, suffused with ochreous and scaled with orange. There are some brownish strigulae (fine streaks) and the markings are pale brownish cream edged with blackish brown. The hindwings are cream with grey suffusions.

References

Moths described in 2006
Clepsis